At least two ships of the Hellenic Navy have borne the name Panthir ("panther"):

 , an  acquired in 1912 and stricken in 1946.
 , a  launched in 1943 as USS Garfield Thomas she was transferred to Greece in 1951 and renamed. She was sunk as a target in 2000.

Hellenic Navy ship names